Tropisetron is a serotonin 5-HT3 receptor antagonist used mainly as an antiemetic to treat nausea and vomiting following chemotherapy, although it has been used experimentally as an analgesic in cases of fibromyalgia. 

It was patented in 1982 and approved for medical use in 1992. It is on the World Health Organization's List of Essential Medicines. It is marketed by Novartis in Europe, Australia, New Zealand, Japan, South Korea and the Philippines as Navoban, but is not available in the U.S. It is also available from Novell Pharmaceutical Laboratories and marketed in several Asian countries as Setrovel.

Pharmacology 
Tropisetron acts as both a selective 5-HT3 receptor antagonist and α7-nicotinic receptor agonist.

Adverse effects 
Tropisetron is a well-tolerated drug with few side effects. Headache, constipation, and dizziness are the most commonly reported side effects associated with its use. Hypotension, transient liver enzyme elevation, immune hypersensitivity syndromes and extrapyramidal side effects have also been associated with its use on at least one occasion. There have been no significant drug interactions reported with this drug's use. It is broken down by the hepatic cytochrome P450 system and it has little effect on the metabolism of other drugs broken down by this system.

Other uses
As a biological stain and as trypanocide

See also 
 5-HT3 receptor antagonist: Drug discovery and development
Zatosetron
Ricasetron
Bemesetron
Tropanserin
Granisetron

References

External links 
 Official site
 Navoban data sheet

Antiemetics
5-HT3 antagonists
Tropanes
Novartis brands
Indoles
Carboxylate esters
Glycine receptor agonists
Glycine receptor antagonists
Nicotinic agonists
World Health Organization essential medicines